MBTA Commuter Rail is the commuter rail system for the Greater Boston metropolitan area of Massachusetts. It is owned by the Massachusetts Bay Transportation Authority (MBTA) and operated under contract by Keolis. In 2019, it was the sixth-busiest commuter rail system in the United States with an average weekday ridership of 121,700. The system's routes span  and cover roughly the eastern third of Massachusetts plus central Rhode Island. They stretch from Newburyport in the north to North Kingstown, Rhode Island, in the south, and reach as far west as Worcester and Fitchburg. The system is split into two parts, with lines north of Boston having a terminus at North Station and lines south of Boston having a terminus at South Station.

, there are 134 active stations on twelve lines, two of which have branches. 108 active stations are accessible; 26 are not. Six additional stations (and ) are indefinitely closed due to service cuts during the COVID-19 pandemic. Three stations (and ) are temporarily closed due to structural deterioration. Six additional stations are under construction as part of the South Coast Rail project; several other stations are planned.

The MBTA was formed in 1964 to subsidize suburban commuter rail service operated by the Boston and Maine Railroad, New York Central Railroad, and New York, New Haven and Hartford Railroad. Subsidies began in stages from 1965 to 1973; a number of stations closed in 1965–1967 before service to them was subsidized, of which 26 have not reopened. Contraction continued into the early 1980s; 42 additional stations closed between 1967 and 1981 have not reopened. Expansion of the system began in the late 1970s, including extensions of existing lines and the reopening of several lines discontinued before the MBTA era. Three additional low-ridership stations have closed since 1981, while several others have been relocated.

Key

Stations

Future stations

Under construction

Six stations are under construction as part of the South Coast Rail project.

Planned

Five additional stations are planned, but not funded, as part of the second phase of the South Coast Rail project.  is planned as part of the redevelopment of the former Beacon Park Yard, while South Salem is municipally planned.

Former stations

Stations closed without MBTA subsidy

The MBTA was formed in August 1964 to subsidize suburban commuter rail services. Subsidies for Boston and Maine Railroad (B&M) lines north of Boston began in 1965; subsidies for New York Central Railroad and New Haven Railroad lines west and south of Boston began later.

A number of out-of-district stations (and several in-district stations) were closed in January 1965; most reopened that June, or over the next decades. However, several minor stations were never reopened. In June 1967, the B&M discontinued never-subsidized Boston– and Boston– round trips - the last remains of B&M interstate service. Several out-of-district stations were also closed in April 1966 when the MBTA began subsidizing several New Haven Railroad lines.

This listing includes only stations closed when MBTA or local subsidies began, or on services that were never subsidized. Stations that later reopened are not listed.

Stations dropped after the start of MBTA subsidies

The following stations had MBTA-subsidized service at one point, but are no longer served by the MBTA. Most were closed between 1967 and 1981, as four limited-service lines and a number of low-ridership stations were dropped. Three additional low-ridership stations were dropped in the 1980s and 1990s.

Relocated stations

Most stations reconstructed (or closed and reopened) during the MBTA era have been rebuilt on or adjacent to the site of the old station. However, several stations have been substantially relocated.

References

MBTA Commuter Rail stations

MBTA Commuter Rail